Trilok Teerth Dham is a Jain temple in Bada Gaon, Baghpat, Uttar Pradesh, India.

History 
Trilok Teerth Dham was initiated by Jain Aacharya Sanmati Sagar near the Parshvanatha temple, Badagaon. The temple construction was completed in 2015.

Location
Trilok Teerth Dham is situated in Khekra in "Parshvanatha Atishaya Kshetra", Bada Gaon, Uttar Pradesh.

Architecture
Trilok Teerth Dham is built in the shape of Jain emblem. The temple structure is the representation of trilok (three lokas) of the Jain cosmology i.e. Adholok, Madhyalok and Urdhvalok. The temple architecture reflect features of Sultanate and Mughal architecture, such as, structure and symmetric arrangement of the four towers in the corner. However, instead of dome or a tower, these four corner tower are built around geomatrical shape of the cosmos. 

This temple also has a 108 feet Manasthamb (tower of pride).

About temple 
The temple enshrines a  ashtadhatu (8 metals) idol of Rishabhanatha seated in lotus position. This temple is dedicated to Parshvantha. This temple also has a 108 feet Manasthamb (tower of pride).

As the name suggests trilok teerth depicts the three lokas of Jain cosmology i.e. Adholok, Madhyalok and Urdhvalok. Light and sound show is organised in this temple.

This temple includes a meditation center, Samavasarana, Nandishwar Dweep, Trikaal Chaubisi, Meru Temple, Lotus Temple, Parshvanath temple, Jambudweep. The temple also has a dharamshala equipped with all modern facilities.

Gallery

See also
 Jambudweep
 Shri Parshwanath Atishaya Kshetra Prachin Digambar Jain Mandir
 Bada Gaon

References

Citation

Source

External links 
 

Jain temples in Uttar Pradesh
Bagpat district
21st-century Jain temples
Colossal Jain statues in India